The Roost is a 2005 American horror film written and directed by Ti West.

Plot
On television show Frightmare Theatre, the Horror Host welcomes viewers and introduces them to the film they are about to see, The Roost.

Four friends – Trevor, Allison, Brian, and Elliot – are traveling to go to a wedding. They are frightened by a bat flying into the windshield and crash the car in a ditch, and are unable to get it started again. With no other ideas, the four go to look for a nearby house to call for help, not realizing the older couple within the nearest house have been killed by an unseen force. While looking for help, the friends are attacked by a swarm of bats. A police officer who comes to investigate the house is attacked by bats as well, causing him to fall off a ledge to his death. However, the bats' attack causes the dead police officer to reanimate and attack the friends, who are forced to imprison him and then kill him.

One by one, each of the friends is attacked by the reanimated corpses of those killed by bats, leaving only Allison and Elliot alive. They realize their situation is hopeless and accept their fate. However, back on the TV program, the Horror Host expresses displeasure at this ending, and rewinds the film to see the film's "alternate", more exciting ending, in which Allison is killed by the bats and Elliot flees the house in the police officer's car. He stops at a bridge, asking a tow truck driver for help. The driver is attacked and killed by another swarm of bats, and Elliot is attacked by a reanimated Allison.

The Horror Host warns viewers that the show is over and his master is home, telling them to leave. The "viewer" holding the camera is attacked by a demonic dog, ending the film.

Cast
 Tom Noonan as Horror Host
 Karl Jacob as Trevor
 Vanessa Horneff as Allison
 Sean Reid as Brian
 Wil Horneff as Elliot
 Barbara Wilhide as May
 Richard Little as Elvin
 John Speredakos as Officer Mitchell
 Larry Fessenden as Tow Truck Driver

Release

Home media
The film was released on DVD by Showtime and Paramount Home Entertainment on October 3, 2006.

Reception

On Metacritic, which assigns a normalized rating to reviews, the film has a weighted average score of 62 out of 100, based on 10 critics, indicating "mixed or average reviews".

Kim Newman from Empire Magazine gave it 3/4 stars, calling it "a creepy vampire variant". Jeannette Catsoulis from New York Times gave the film a mixed review, writing, "Creatively shot and framed by the cinematographer Eric Robbins, who constructs gorgeously lighted centerpieces surrounded by strips of menacing black, the movie almost overcomes its low budget and threadbare plot. Almost."
Robert Koehler from Variety wrote, "The Roost celebrates and restores the 1970s B-horror pic with zero gloss and terrific, rough-hewn craft."

References

External links 
 
  
 
 

2005 films
2005 horror films
American supernatural horror films
Films about bats
Films directed by Ti West
Films shot in Delaware
Glass Eye Pix films
American haunted house films
Supernatural slasher films
2005 directorial debut films
2000s English-language films
2000s American films